The 2014 EMF miniEuro was the 5th edition of the EMF miniEURO for national Small-sided football teams. It was hosted in Herceg Novi, Montenegro, from 26 to 30 November 2014.

The final tournament was contested by 24 teams. The matches were played in one venue in the town of Igalo, Herceg Novi Municipality  at the Sport Center Igalo.

The defending champions, Romania, kept their title by overcoming Slovenia 1–0 in the final.

Draw 
The final tournament draw was held at the Igalo Spa Hotel, in Igalo, Montenegro on 15 October 2014.

Group stage
In the group stage, a total of 36 matches (six matches per group) were played between 26 and 28 November, the teams finishing in the top two positions in each of the six groups progressed to the knockout stage, along with the best four third-placed teams.

If two or more teams are equal on points on completion of the group matches (including in determining the best third-placed teams), the following tie-breaking criteria are applied:
 Result of the match(es) played among the teams in question;
 Superior goal difference in all group matches;
 Higher number of goals scored in all group matches;
 Higher number of wins in all group matches;
 Position in the EMF ranking system;
 Difficulty of opponents (according to the EMF ranking system);
 Draw.

Group A

Group B

Group C

Group D

Group E

Group F

Ranking of third-placed teams

Knockout stage
The round of 16 and the quarter-finals were played on 29 November 2014 and the semi-finals, third place play-off and the final, were played on 30 November 2014. If a match was drawn after 40 minutes of regular play, a penalty shoot-out is used to determine the winner.

Bracket

References

External links
 Official competition website

2014
International sports competitions hosted by Montenegro
2014 in European sport
2014 in Montenegrin sport
Herceg Novi